Shtanë is a village in the former municipality of Malzi in Kukës County, Albania. At the 2015 local government reform it became part of the municipality Kukës.

References

Populated places in Kukës
Villages in Kukës County